The Astor Place Theatre is an off-Broadway house located at 434 Lafayette Street in the NoHo section of Manhattan. The theater is located in the historic Colonnade Row, originally constructed in 1831 as a series of nine connected buildings, of which only four remain. Though it bears the same name, it was not the site of the Astor Place Riot of 1849.

Designed in Greek Revival style and fronted by imposing marble columns, the buildings served as residences for the Astor and Vanderbilt families, and are among the oldest structures in the city. They were designated as New York City landmarks in 1963.

Bruce Mailman bought the building in 1965. On January 17 1968, the theater opened with Israel Horovitz’s The Indian Wants the Bronx starring newcomer Al Pacino. Since then, it has gained a reputation for introducing works by aspiring and often experimental playwrights, including Tom Eyen (Women Behind Bars, The Dirtiest Show in Town) and John Ford Noonan (A Couple White Chicks Sitting Around Talking). Established writers like Terrence McNally (Bad Habits), A.R. Gurney (The Dining Room, The Perfect Party) and Larry Shue (The Foreigner) also have premiered plays here. The musical revue, Jacques Brel is Alive and Well and Living in Paris enjoyed a successful run in 1974.

Since 1991, the theater has served as home to the Blue Man Group, which purchased the theatre in 2001.

References

External links
 

Off-Broadway theaters
Astor Place Theatre
1968 establishments in New York City
Theatre